Kiana Aran is an American biomedical entrepreneur who is Associate Professor in Medical Diagnostics at the Keck Graduate Institute. She is also the Chief Scientific Officer at Cardea Bio. Her research considers the application of two dimensional materials in disease detection and diagnosis. She was awarded the 2021 Nature – Estée Lauder Research Award for Inspiring Women in Science.

Early life and education 
Aran was an undergraduate student at City University of New York and majored in electrical engineering. She was a graduate student at Rutgers University, where she focused on biomedical engineering. For her doctoral research she worked on a microfluidic platform for the extraction of diagnostic plasma proteins. The microfluidic platform was designed to work in a clinical environment and offer the continuous monitoring of the inflammatory response of patients undergoing cardiac surgeries. The system designed by Aran comprised a two-compartment mass chamber, which allows for the continuous separation of blood plasma from blood cells with no evidence of cell lysis. A 200 nm pore size membrane can extract 15% of pure plasma at high sampling frequencies. She moved to the University of California, Berkeley as a graduate student, where she worked on bioelectronics.

Research and career 
Aran has continued to develop novel biosensing platforms. She invented the CRISPR-chip, an electronic sensor that uses CRISPR-Cas to scan genomes and samples of nucleic acid for disease mutations. The chip integrates Clustered Regularly Interspaced Short Palindromic Repeat (CRISPR) with single molecule graphene field-effect transistors to generate electronic signals when CRISPR interacts with target DNA/RNA. She has demonstrated that the CRISPR-Chip can detect the mutations associated with sickle cell and Duchenne muscular dystrophy.

Aran is co-founder and Chief Scientific Officer of Cardea, a biotechnology company.

Awards and honors 
 2020 Clinical OMICs 10 under 40 Award
 2020 Athena Pinnacle Award
 2021 NSF Career Award
 2021 Nature Research Awards for Inspiring Women in Science

Selected publications

References 

Women bioengineers
Claremont Graduate University faculty
Rutgers University alumni
City University of New York alumni
Living people
Year of birth missing (living people)